Mejillones is a Chilean port city and commune in Antofagasta Province in the Antofagasta Region. Its name is the plural form of the Spanish  meaning "mussel", referring to a particularly abundant species and preferred staple food of its indigenous inhabitants. It is situated in the northern side of the Mejillones Peninsula, 60 km north of the city of Antofagasta.

Mejillones is surrounded by the waters of the Pacific Ocean to the west and by the most arid desert in the world to the east, the Atacama. It also marks the country's widest point (362 km) along a parallel.

History

The settlement of Mejillones dates back to the first communities of Chango people who inhabited the coastal area from 1825.

Mejillones was included in maps of the Captaincy General of Chile in the 18th century, depending from the city of Copiapó.

In this manner, Luan López began mining around the vicinity of San Luciano hill in 1841. The concession for the mining of this raw material was obtained by Domingo Latrille at the hands of the Bolivian government, which would last until 1842. Between 1841 and 1842, they made the largest shipments of this product to Europe.

In 1845, President of Bolivia Manuel Isidoro Belzu had a small fort built on the south side of Mejillones, to become a minor port of Bolivia. Through project development, the Bolivian government proposed to establish a major port city in the large jurisdiction of Mejillones.

The territory was disputed between Chile and Bolivia until the signing of the Boundary Treaty of 1866. Subsequently, one of these buildings was transferred to the city of Antofagasta during the War of the Pacific; currently, this building is still in force and designated as the "Regional Museum".

On October 8, 1879, the Battle of Angamos was fought here in front of the peninsula of Angamos between the navies of  Chile and Peru, which ended in the Chilean capture of the monitor .  Afterward, the increasingly prosperous nitrate industry showed a boom going through the port at Mejillones, where the mineral boarded on the Antofagasta railroad left for foreign ports abroad. During this time, strong waves wreaked havoc on the shipping facilities, which required the reestablishment of Mejillones, this time reborn under the Chilean flag.

Also after the War of the Pacific, administrative organization began, which in the case of Mejillones would involve the preparation of urban planning in agreement with the existing type of port. This work was commissioned to naval engineer Emilio de Vitds. The plan, which was perhaps more realistic than those proposed before, was based on 63 city blocks and was completed with the Foundation Act, signed by president Germán Riesco and dated February 7, 1906.

In 1970, a majority vote approved the bill presented by Mayor Araya Cuadra to build a theater located across the rear of the Plaza Almirante Latorre. The work was carried out with the grant of a loan by the Ministry of Housing and Urban Development in the amount of $500,000. Such funding would not satisfy the completion of the project, and work stopped in 1972 pending the granting of a loan extension that failed to materialize by the time of the coup of the Armed Forces of September 11th of 1973.

Demographics
According to data from the 2002 census by the National Institute of Statistics, the Mejillones commune has 10,042 inhabitants; of these, 7,888 (78.6%) live in urban areas and 530 (5.3%) in rural areas. At that time, there were 4,654 men and 3,764 women residing in the commune. In the ten years since the previous census of 1992 (pop. 6,315), the population grew 33.3% (2,103 persons).

Administration
As a commune, Mejillones is a third-level administrative division of Chile administered by a municipal council, headed by an alcalde who is directly elected every four years.

Within the electoral divisions of Chile, Mejillones is represented in the Chamber of Deputies by Pedro Araya (PRI) and Manuel Rojas  (UDI) as part of the 4th electoral district, together with Antofagasta, Sierra Gorda, and Taltal. The commune is represented in the Senate by Carlos Cantero Ojeda (Ind.) and José Antonio Gómez Urrutia (PRSD) as part of the 2nd senatorial constituency (Antofagasta Region).

References

External links
  

Communes of Chile
Populated places in Antofagasta Province
Port cities in Chile
Populated places established in 1879
1879 establishments in Chile
Coasts of Antofagasta Region